American Pearl is the sole studio album by the American hard rock band of the same name. Released on August 22, 2000, it features the singles "If We Were Kings" and "Free Your Mind". The track "Automatic" was featured on the Scream 3 soundtrack. Along with "Free Your Mind", it also appeared in the Funimation dub of the animated movie Dragon Ball Z: Lord Slug in 2001. The tracks "Seven Years" and "Revelation" appeared in Dragon Ball Z: Cooler's Revenge the following year.

After signing with Wind-up Records in 1999, the band opened concerts for Buckcherry and The Cult and even acquired a spot on Woodstock '99. In promotion of their debut album, American Pearl toured extensively through North America and Japan, as a headliner and as support act for Kiss, Creed, 3 Doors Down, and Days of the New.

Stylistically, American Pearl differs from the popular alternative metal scene of the era and follows more in the vein classic hard rock acts and punk-laced LA bands of the 1980s. Indeed, the album was produced by Steve Jones of Sex Pistols fame and Mudrock. However, American Pearl has also been categorized as post-grunge.

Reception

MacKenzie Wilson of AllMusic gave the album 3 out of 5 stars and noted, "If it were the heyday of '70s arena rock, L.A.-based hard rock outfit American Pearl would be just as cool as Foreigner, Survivor, Kansas, and Boston" and that the band "captures such memories and maintains a gnarling edge." However, Wilson also claimed that American Pearl's style "pinpoints" them as "just another alternative rock band".

CANOE's Darryl Sterdan gave a favorable albeit brief review of the album. He described the band as having the "sleaze-rock punch of Guns N' Roses and Mötley Crüe" and "Sunset Strip sensibility" of Buckcherry. Sterdan summed up by stating "Thankfully, American Pearl are as talented with a hook as Quinn must be with that needle."

Track listing
"California"  3:31
"Automatic"  3:24
"Giveaway"  3:03
"Underground"  4:56
"Free Your Mind"  3:24
"Truth"  3:36
"Bleed"  4:08
"Seven Years"   4:28
"Revelation"  3:08
"Amphetamine Girl"  3:43
"If We Were Kings"  3:56

References

External links
 "If We Were Kings" – music video on YouTube

2000 debut albums
American Pearl albums
Wind-up Records albums